Fearless or The Fearless may refer to:

Psychology
 Lack of fear
 Courage or bravery

Film, television and audio

Film
 Fearless (1978 film), an Italian film directed by Stelvio Massi
 Fearless (1993 film), an American drama directed by Peter Weir
 Fearless, a 1999 New Zealand television film produced by South Pacific Pictures
 Fearless (2006 film), a Chinese-Hong Kong martial arts film directed by Ronny Yu
 Fearless (2020 film), an animated comedy film

Television and audio
 Fearless (2016 TV series), a Portuguese-language sports documentary series
 Fearless (British TV series), a 2017 British crime thriller
 Fearless (2022 TV series), an Australian documentary series
 Fearless (TV pilot), a 2003 pilot based on the Francine Pascal novel series (see below)
 DGUSA Fearless, a series of professional wrestling pay-per-view events
 Fearless, a DVD by David Blaine
 Bobby "Fearless" Smith, a fictional character in the series Boomtown
 The Fearless, a 2007 season of the audio drama series Dalek Empire

Episodes 
 "Fearless" (Beverly Hills, 90210)
 "Fearless" (Boomtown)
 "Fearless" (Fallen Angels)
 "Fearless" (Rescue: Special Ops)
 "Fearless" (Tutenstein)
 "Fearless" (The Wizard of Oz)

Literature
 Fearless (Angel novel), a 2003 novel based on the American TV series Angel
 Fearless (Lott novel), a 2007 novel by Tim Lott
 Fearless, A Novel of Sarah Bowman, a 1998 novel by Lucia St. Clair Robson
 Fearless, a novel by T. E. Berry-Hart
 Fearless, a novel by Cornelia Funke
 Fearless, a novel by Rafael Yglesias
 Fearless (novel series), juvenile novels by Francine Pascal
 Fearless (comics), a limited series by Mark Sable and P.J. Holden from Image Comics

Music

Albums
 Fearless (Acrania album), 2015
 Fearless (Cowboy Mouth album), 2008
 Fearless (Crystal Lewis album), or the title song, 2000
 Fearless (Eighth Wonder album), 1988
 Fearless (Family album), 1971
 Fearless (Fleur East album), 2020
 Fearless (Francis Dunnery album), 1994
 Fearless (Group 1 Crew album), 2012
 Fearless (Jazmine Sullivan album), 2008
 Fearless (Keri Noble album), 2004
 Fearless (Marvaless album), 1998
 Fearless (Nina Hagen album), 1984
 Fearless (Phillips, Craig and Dean album), 2009
 Fearless (S7N album), 2013
 Fearless (Taylor Swift album) or the title song (see below), 2008
 Fearless (Taylor's Version), a re-recording of the 2008 album, 2021
 Fearless (Terri Clark album), 2000
 Fearless (Tim Curry album), 1979
 Fearless (Travis Ryan album), 2012
 Fearless (Virtue album), 2016
 Fearless, by Collin Raye, 2006
 Fearless, by Marina Kaye, 2015
 Fearless, by Vaughn, 2001

EPs
 Fearless (G.E.M. EP), 2018
 Fearless (Jay Chou EP), 2006
 Fearless (Le Sserafim EP), 2022

Songs
 "Fearless" (The Bravery song), 2005
 "Fearless" (Le Sserafim song), 2022
 "Fearless" (Pink Floyd song), 1971
 "Fearless" (Taylor Swift song), 2010
 "Fearless" (Wes Carr song), 2009
 "Fearless", by Colbie Caillat from Breakthrough
 "Fearless", by DC Talk from Supernatural
 "Fearless", by Goo Goo Dolls from Miracle Pill
 "Fearless", by Gromee ft. May-Britt Scheffer
 "Fearless", by Hypocrisy from Virus
 "Fearless", by Isabela Merced from Spirit Untamed
 "Fearless", by Louis Tomlinson from Walls
 "Fearless", by Michelle Williams
 "Fearless", by Ozzy Osbourne from Scream
 "Fearless", by VNV Nation from Futureperfect

Other
 Fearless Records, an American record label
 Fearless Management, an American management company specializing in music

People
 Fearless (gamer), stage name of professional esports player Lee Eui-seok

Ships
 HMS Fearless, various ships of the British Royal Navy
 USS Fearless, various ships the United States Navy
 Fearless-class landing platform dock, a class of British Royal Navy amphibious warfare ships
 Fearless-class patrol vessel, Republic of Singapore Navy
Fearless (tugboat), Canadian-built 1945 vessel currently in Port Adelaide, Australia

See also
 
 List of people known as the Fearless